Charlotte Fabre (born 29 July 1981) is a French former synchronized swimmer who competed in the 2000 Summer Olympics.

References

1981 births
Living people
Sportspeople from Nice
French synchronized swimmers
Olympic synchronized swimmers of France
Synchronized swimmers at the 2000 Summer Olympics